Crobialus or Krobialos was a town on the Black Sea coast of ancient Paphlagonia, mentioned by Apollonius Rhodius, with Cromna and Cytorus; and Gaius Valerius Flaccus has the same name. Stephanus of Byzantium quotes the verse of Apollonius. We may assume that it was in the neighbourhood of Cromna and Cytorus. Crobialus and Cobialus seem to be the same place. However, Crobialus and Aegialus were distinct.

Its site is unlocated.

References

Populated places in ancient Paphlagonia
Former populated places in Turkey
Lost ancient cities and towns